is a Japanese football player currently playing for Okinawa SV.

Career statistics
Updated to 23 February 2020.

References

External links

Profile at Tochigi SC

1987 births
Living people
Association football people from Saitama Prefecture
Japanese footballers
J1 League players
J2 League players
J3 League players
Urawa Red Diamonds players
Thespakusatsu Gunma players
Tochigi SC players
Okinawa SV players
Association football midfielders